John Thomson Stonehouse (28 July 192514 April 1988) was a British Labour and Co-operative Party politician, businessman and minister who attended the cabinet of Harold Wilson. Stonehouse is remembered for his unsuccessful attempt at faking his own death in 1974. It is also alleged that Stonehouse had been an agent for the Czechoslovak Socialist Republic military intelligence.

Early life and education
Stonehouse was born on 28 July 1925 in Southampton, the second son and youngest of four children of Post Office engineer and later dockyard engine-fitter William Mitchell Stonehouse, and Rosina Marie, née Taylor. His father was local secretary of his trade union; Stonehouse joined the Labour Party at the age of sixteen. His mother, a former scullery maid, was the sixth female mayor of Southampton and a councillor on Southampton City Council from 1936 to 1970. 

Stonehouse was educated at Taunton's School (now Richard Taunton Sixth Form College), Southampton, and served as a Royal Air Force pilot from 1944 until 1946. He then attended the London School of Economics (LSE), where he read for a BSc (Econ.) degree. During his time at the LSE, he was chairman of both the chess club and the Labour society. The political scientist Bernard Crick, who was a contemporary of Stonehouse at university, recalls that his then nickname was 'Lord John', and that "his conversation was openly and restlessly about how best to get a parliamentary seat."

An economist, Stonehouse became involved in co-operative enterprise and was a manager of African co-operative societies in Uganda (1952–54). He served as a director (1956–62) and President (1962–64) of the London Co-operative Society.

Political career
Stonehouse stood unsuccessfully in Norwood at the 1949 London County Council election. He was first elected as Labour Co-operative Member of Parliament (MP) for Wednesbury in Staffordshire in a 1957 by-election, having contested Twickenham in 1950 and Burton in 1951.

In February 1959, Stonehouse travelled to the Federation of Rhodesia and Nyasaland on a fact-finding tour in which he condemned the White minority government of Southern Rhodesia. Speaking to the Southern Rhodesia African National Congress, he encouraged Blacks to stand up for their rights and said they had the support of the British Labour Party. He was promptly deported from Southern Rhodesia and banned from returning a year later.

Stonehouse served as a junior minister of aviation, where he was involved in BOAC's order of Boeing 707 aircraft from the United States, against his own recommendation that they should buy a British aircraft, the Super Vickers VC10. This led to his making accusations against colleagues about the reasons for the decision. In March 1968, he negotiated an agreement providing a framework for the long-term development of technological co-operation between Britain and Czechoslovakia. It provided for the exchange of specialists and information, facilities for study and research in technology, and such other forms of industrial co-operation which might be agreed.

While in the Colonial Office, Stonehouse's rise continued, and in 1967 he became Minister of State for Technology under Tony Benn and later Postmaster General until the position was abolished by the Post Office Act 1969.

As Minister of Posts and Telecommunications in 1970, he oversaw the controversial jamming of the offshore radio station Radio North Sea International. When Labour was defeated at the 1970 general election, he was not appointed to the Shadow Cabinet.

When the Wednesbury constituency was abolished in 1974, he stood for and was elected to the nearby Walsall North constituency in February 1974. With Labour now governing in minority, another election was called in September, and Stonehouse was re-elected with an increased majority of nearly 16,000 in the October 1974 election, where Labour won a narrow majority, just six weeks before his disappearance. His last Parliamentary contribution before his disappearance was at Prime Minister's Questions on 14 November; he flew to Miami, Florida on 17 November.

Spy allegations
Stonehouse allegedly began spying for Czechoslovakia in 1962. In a meeting with Harold Wilson in 1969, Stonehouse was informed of assertions that he was a Czechoslovak secret service agent; the informant was a defector from the Czechoslovak StB secret service, who had been debriefed by the US security services. At that time, Stonehouse successfully defended himself. In 2009, the spy allegation was substantiated in the official history of MI5, The Defence of the Realm (2009) by Cambridge historian Christopher Andrew. In December 2010, it was revealed that, in 1980, then-Prime Minister Margaret Thatcher had agreed to cover up revelations that Stonehouse had been a Czechoslovak spy since the 1960s as there was insufficient evidence to bring him to trial. Until Ray Mawby, briefly a member of a Conservative government, was exposed in June 2012, Stonehouse was the only Minister known to have been an agent for the former Eastern bloc.

Business interests
After 1970, Stonehouse set up various companies in an attempt to secure a regular income. By 1974, most of these were in financial trouble, and he had resorted to deceptive creative accounting. Aware that the Department of Trade and Industry was looking at his affairs, he decided that his best choice would be to flee. Secret British government documents, declassified in 2005, indicate that Stonehouse spent months rehearsing his new identity, that of Joseph Markham, the deceased husband of a constituent.

Faking own death 
Stonehouse maintained the pretence of normality until he faked his death on 20 November 1974, leaving a pile of clothes on a beach in Miami Beach to make it appear that he had gone swimming and had drowned, or possibly had been killed by a shark. He was presumed dead, and obituaries were published in British newspapers despite the fact that no corpse had been found. In reality, he was en route to Australia, some 9,000 miles away, hoping to set up a new life with his mistress and secretary, Sheila Buckley.

Using false identities, Stonehouse set about transferring large sums of money between banks as a further means of covering his tracks. Under the name of Clive Mildoon, he deposited A$21,500 in cash at the Bank of New Zealand. The teller who handled the money later spotted "Mildoon" at the Bank of New South Wales. Inquiries led the teller to learn that the money was in the name of Joe Markham and he informed the local police. Stonehouse spent a while in Copenhagen with Sheila Buckley, but later returned to Australia, unaware that he was now under surveillance. The police initially suspected him of being Lord Lucan, who had disappeared a fortnight before Stonehouse, following the murder of his children's nanny, Sandra Rivett. Investigators noted that the suspect was reading British newspapers that also included stories attacking the "recently deceased" John Stonehouse. They contacted Scotland Yard, requesting pictures of both Lord Lucan and Stonehouse. On his arrest, the police instructed him to pull down his trousers so they could be sure whether or not he was Lord Lucan, who had a six-inch scar on the inside of his right thigh.

Arrest and aftermath 
Stonehouse was arrested in Melbourne on 24 December 1974. He applied for the position of Steward and Bailiff of the Chiltern Hundreds while still in Australia (one of the ways for an MP to resign), but decided not to sign the papers. On 17 July 1975, Stonehouse was extradited to the UK, escorted by Scotland Yard officers. He had tried to obtain offers of asylum from Sweden or Mauritius. He was remanded in Brixton Prison until August 1975 when he was released on bail. He continued to serve as an MP. On 20 October 1975 he made a personal statement to the House of Commons, stating his reasons for his disappearance, his first Parliamentary oration since his disappearance almost a year earlier:

Although unhappy with the situation, the Labour Party did not expel him. Their Parliamentary majority was very narrow. On 4 April 1976 Stonehouse attended a St George's Day festival hosted by the English National Party: he later confirmed he had joined the party, making Labour a minority government.

Stonehouse conducted his own defence on 21 charges of fraud, theft, forgery, conspiracy to defraud, causing a false police investigation and wasting police time. His trial lasted 68 days. On 6 August 1976, he was convicted and sentenced to seven years in prison for fraud, and received a criminal bankruptcy order. He agreed to resign as a Privy Counsellor on 17 August 1976, becoming one of only three people to resign from the Privy Council in the 20th century. Stonehouse tendered his resignation via the Chiltern Hundreds route from the House of Commons on 27 August 1976. The subsequent by-election was won by Robin Hodgson, a Conservative. In October 1976, Stonehouse was declared bankrupt.

Stonehouse was imprisoned in HM Prison Wormwood Scrubs. On 30 June 1977, the House of Lords refused his appeal against five of the charges of which he was convicted. While he was in prison, he complained that the prison workshop where he worked played pop music on the radio station. When his health deteriorated, he was moved to HM Prison Blundeston in Suffolk.

Health problems

On 14 August 1979, Stonehouse was released early from prison because of good behaviour and because he had suffered three heart attacks; he had the first on 18 April 1977, a second one four days later, and a massive heart attack on 13 August 1978. On 6 September 1978 Stonehouse suffered a coronary ischemia attack which required him to spend three days in hospital. He underwent open heart surgery on 7 November 1978 which lasted for six hours.

After release

From January 1980, Stonehouse was a volunteer fundraiser for the East London-based charity, Community Links. He joined the Social Democratic Party (SDP), which later amalgamated with the Liberal Party to become the Liberal Democrats. In June 1980, he was discharged from bankruptcy. Stonehouse wrote three novels, and made TV appearances and radio broadcasts during the rest of his life, mostly in connection with discussing his disappearance. In June 1986 he appeared on TVS's Regrets programme and in December that year on the BBC Radio 4 interview programme In The Psychiatrist's Chair with Anthony Clare.

Personal life

Stonehouse married Barbara Joan Smith in 1948, and they had two daughters, Jane and Julia, and a son, Mathew. After their divorce in 1978, Stonehouse married his mistress, Sheila Elizabeth Buckley (nee Black), in Hampshire on 31 January 1981. In December 1982 their son James William John was born.

Stonehouse's daughter Julia Stonehouse published an account of her father's life in 2021 entitled John Stonehouse, My Father: The True Story of the Runaway MP; it was released almost simultaneously with a book called Stonehouse: Cabinet Minister, Fraudster, Spy, by criminal defence solicitor Julian Hayes, who is Stonehouse's great nephew through the author's father, Michael Hayes, who was the MP's nephew and his lawyer. Julia Stonehouse has an eponymous website in which she questions the veracity of other books and broadcasts about her father.

Death
On 25 March 1988, Stonehouse collapsed on set during an edition of Central Weekend in Birmingham during the filming of a programme about missing people. He was given emergency medical treatment at the studio and an ambulance was called. He was diagnosed as having suffered a minor heart attack and kept in the city's general hospital overnight. Just under three weeks later, early on 14 April, he suffered a massive heart attack at his house at Dales Way in Totton, Hampshire, where he had moved six months earlier, having lived in London since his release from prison, his last address there having been at 20 Shirland Mews. This time Stonehouse could not be saved, and he died in hospital at 2.30am. He was cremated in Bassett Green, Southampton, on 22 April 1988. The former MP Bruce Douglas-Mann paid tribute. In 1989, his fourth novel was published posthumously. He left under £70,000 according to his will published on 17 August 1988.

TV series

The British ITV  series  Stonehouse, a dramatization of Stonehouse's story, was first broadcast from 2 to 4 January 2023. The series starred Matthew Macfadyen and Keeley Hawes and was directed by Jon S. Baird from a script by John Preston.

Bibliography
  – Stonehouse's account of his 1959 African tour, which culminated in his deportation from Southern Rhodesia.
 .
 .
 .
 .
 .
 .

References

Further reading

External links 
 
 

1925 births
1988 deaths
20th-century English businesspeople
20th-century English criminals
Alumni of the London School of Economics
British people accused of spying for Czechoslovakia (1945–1989)
British politicians convicted of crimes
British politicians convicted of fraud
Criminals from Hampshire
English fraudsters
English nationalists
English politicians convicted of crimes
Labour Co-operative MPs for English constituencies
Ministers in the Wilson governments, 1964–1970
People who faked their own death
People who resigned from the Privy Council of the United Kingdom
Politicians from Hampshire
Politicians from Southampton
Royal Air Force pilots of World War II
Social Democratic Party (UK) politicians
UK MPs 1955–1959
UK MPs 1959–1964
UK MPs 1964–1966
UK MPs 1966–1970
UK MPs 1970–1974
UK MPs 1974
UK MPs 1974–1979
United Kingdom Postmasters General
Western spies for the Eastern Bloc